The Wilhemstraße is an urban boulevard in Wiesbaden, state capital of Hesse, Germany. Nicknamed Rue by the locals, the Wilhelmstraße is one of Germany's busiest, upscale shopping streets.

The Wilhelmstraße is some 900 metres long and lies in the district of Nordost. It stretches from the Kureck (Spa) to Rheinstraße and Friedrich-Ebert-Allee on its southern end. At Kureck, the Wilhelmstraße reaches onto Warmer Damm, a park with a huge pond. Adjacent to Wilhelmstraße is the quarter Mitte, Wiesbaden's old quarter.
The Eastern side of Wilhelmstraße is entirely commercial, with upmarket stores and shopping arcades leading to and from the boulevard. The Western side is quieter, given that it predominantly has parks and some historical buildings.

Places of interest nearby 

 Hotel Nassauer Hof, five star luxury hotel
 Kurhaus Wiesbaden with Casino and Kurpark
 Hessisches Staatstheater Wiesbaden
 Bowling Green
 Erbprinzenpalais
 Villa Clementine
 Museum Wiesbaden
 Rhein-Main-Hallen

See also
 
 List of leading shopping streets and districts by city
 Pentagon (Wiesbaden)

Shopping districts and streets in Germany
Streets in Wiesbaden
Landmarks in Germany
Tourist attractions in Wiesbaden
Wilhelmstrasse